Sydney Jones Yard (November 5, 1855 - January 2, 1909) was an American painter who became one of the most famous watercolor artists in the United States, and the first professional artist to settle in the new community of Carmel-by-the-Sea, California.

Early life

Sydney J. Yard was born on November 5, 1855, in Rockford, Illinois. He was the son of William K. Yard (1832-1913) and Mary Ann Jones (1836-1915). He was first married to Carrie E. Millard (1858-1894) in 1877 but she died on August 27, 1894, and he remarried to Fannie M. Estabrook on July 18, 1898, in Santa Clara, California. Yard was married twice. His daughter from his first marriage married the painter Charles Chapel Judson.

Career

Yard was trained as a painter in Chicago and New York and then in England with artist Harold Sutton Palmer (1853-1933). He became a master of English watercolor technique. He was also an oil painter. His works were in the Tonalist tradition of George Inness and William Keith, where the emphasis was on painting modest, Barbizon influenced scenes, rendered in warm tones. Yard's watercolors were of the eucalyptus, oaks, and the cypress trees.

In 1882, he moved to California and joined a partnership with photographer Andrew Putman Hill (1853-1922). They had portrait studios in San Jose, California and Palo Alto, California. In 1992, the two men exhibited photographs of Santa Clara County, California at the California State Fair in Sacramento, California, including views of an Mission Church.

Yard's disestablish his partnership with Hill along with career as a professional photographer as he became more successful in exhibiting his watercolors and oil paintings in San Francisco. In 1883, he had a showing at the San Francisco Art Association's spring and winter exhibitions. In 1897 and 1898 his work showed at the winter exhibitions at the Mark Hoppkins Institute of Art in San Francisco. That show included his watercolors, Coast Near Pacific Grove and In the Santa Cruz Mountains. In 1897, he opened his own art studio in San Jose.

In June 1899, Yard applied for a passport. He traveled to London and sketched landscapes in Scotland. Shortly after his return, in April 1900, Yard had a solo exhibition at the Vickery, Atkins & Torrey gallery in San Francisco. The San Francisco Call gave the following review:

In 1900, he was in Monterey, California, and did watercolors of the sea, pine trees, and the rocky shores. In Pacific Grove, California he painted a scene of pine trees in shadows and sunlight.

Yard continued to live and paint in San Jose until he moved to Oakland in 1904, and opened a studio in Montgomery Block in San Francisco and began teaching. In Oakland he exhibited at the Oakland Art Fund in 1904. There he became friends with Mary DeNeale Morgan and Charles Chapel Judson. At the Oakland Art Fund, Yard displayed six paintings.

In 1905, he relocated to the art colony of Carmel-by-the-Sea. He survived the 1906 San Francisco earthquake. In 1908, Yard designed his house on Lincoln Street and 7th Avenue, and Michael J. Murphy (builder) built it. He later added an art studio, where he had regular showings. He showed his work at the Del Monte Art Gallery between 1907 and 1909. In 1908, Yard exhibited at the Oakland Free Library and the Berkley Art Association. He was a member of the Carmel Arts and Crafts Club.

Works

Death

Yard died on January 2, 1909, at age 54, in Carmel-by-the-Sea, from a heart attack on the steps of the Carmel Post Office.

After his death, his works were exhibited at the American Art Gallery in New York and the Alaska–Yukon–Pacific Exposition in Seattle. His watercolors continued to display at Vickery's, the Oakland's Orpheum Theatre, and the Gump Gallery in San Francisco.

References

External links
Sydney Yard
Carmel-by-the-Sea, The Early Years (1903-1913)

 

1855 births
1909 deaths
English emigrants to the United States
People from Carmel-by-the-Sea, California
American male painters
American watercolorists
Painters from California
19th-century American painters
19th-century American male artists
20th-century American painters
20th-century American male artists